The 1919 Tasmanian state election was held on 31 May 1919 in the Australian state of Tasmania to elect 30 members of the Tasmanian House of Assembly. The election used the Hare-Clark proportional representation system — six members were elected from each of five electorates.

By the 1919 election, the Liberal Party had regrouped and been renamed as the Nationalist Party. The Premier of Tasmania, Walter Lee, had led the party for a relatively untroubled three years, despite the Liberals' one-seat majority over Labor and the uncertainty of World War I.

The Labor Party in Tasmania went into the 1919 election led by Joseph Lyons. Lee led the Nationalist Party to victory, with a 14% margin over Labor, although they only won 16 of the 30 seats in the House of Assembly. Independent Joshua Whitsitt retained his seat.

Results

|}

Distribution of votes

Primary vote by division

Distribution of seats

See also
 Members of the Tasmanian House of Assembly, 1919–1922
 Candidates of the 1919 Tasmanian state election

References

External links
Assembly Election Results, 1919, Parliament of Tasmania.
Report on General Election, 1916, Tasmanian Electoral Commission, 29 October 1919.

Elections in Tasmania
1919 elections in Australia
1910s in Tasmania
May 1919 events